Diaporthe phaseolorum is a plant pathogen with five subspecies:
Diaporthe phaseolorum var. batatae
Diaporthe phaseolorum var. caulivora
Diaporthe phaseolorum var. meridionalis
Diaporthe phaseolorum var. phaseolorum
Diaporthe phaseolorum var. sojae

See also
 List of soybean diseases

References

Fungal plant pathogens and diseases
phaseolorum
Soybean diseases